The Mistress of Solderhof is a 1955 West German drama film directed by Jürgen von Alten and starring Ilse Werner, Viktor Staal, and Harald Maresch.

It was shot at the Bavaria Studios in Munich and on location in Baden-Baden, Bad Aibling and around the lake at Chiemsee. The film's sets were designed by the art director Willy Schatz.

Cast

References

Bibliography

External links 
 

1955 films
1955 drama films
German drama films
West German films
1950s German-language films
Films directed by Jürgen von Alten
Films shot at Bavaria Studios
German black-and-white films
1950s German films